Hetukar Jha (5 March 1944 – 19 August 2017) was an Indian author, professor, researcher, and Fulbright Scholar. He was an honorary managing trustee of the Maharajadhiraja Kameshwar Singh Kalyani Foundation.

Early life and family
Jha was born on  5 March 1944 in Sarisav Pahi village, Madhubani district, Bihar. His father was Babu Chemkar Jha, also known as Baldeo Jha, and his mother was Mohini Devi. He studied in the village school.

Education
He matriculated from Maharaja Lakshmeshwar Singh Academy, Sarisab Pahi, Dist Madhubani. He attended Patna Science College and went on to Post Graduate work at Patna University.  He gained his B.A. Hons. in Sociology at Patna College in 1965, his M.A. in Sociology at Patna University in 1967, and his PhD in Sociology at Patna University in 1980.
Won Patna University Students' Union election in 1967-68 and served as Vice-President.

Career
He joined Patna University as a Lecturer in Sociology in 1968 and retired as Professor and Head of the Department of Sociology in January 2004.

Beginning in 1968, he researched the societies and cultures of Bihar. Among his conclusions is that: A basic problem is the break down of the traditional village community as a functioning whole.

Jha wrote several books.

Death 
Jha died on 19 August 2017 in Patna, Bihar at the age 73. He was cremated in his native village Sarisav Pahi in Madhubani district. He was survived by his wife and sons.

Notes

Further reading

External links
 Prof. Hetukar Jha, Department of Sociology (Retd.), Patna (Bihar) speaking on the "Sociology of Sanitation, Archived 15 August 2014

Indian sociologists
1944 births
2017 deaths
Patna University alumni
Academic staff of Patna University
Writers from Patna
Indian social sciences writers
Indian male writers
20th-century Indian educational theorists
20th-century Indian non-fiction writers
Scholars from Bihar